Munna Bhai M.B.B.S. is a 2003 Indian Hindi-language comedy drama film written and directed by Rajkumar Hirani (in his directorial debut) and produced by Vidhu Vinod Chopra. It was the first installment of  Munna Bhai series. Released in India on 19 December 2003, it features Sunil Dutt in his final film role as the father to his real-life son, Sanjay Dutt, who stars as the titular character. The cast also includes Gracy Singh, Jimmy Sheirgill, Arshad Warsi, Rohini Hattangadi, and Boman Irani.

Based in Mumbai, the films follows Munna Bhai (Sanjay Dutt), a goon who tries to please his father (Sunil Dutt) by pretending to be a doctor. When a doctor, Asthana (Irani), exposes Munna's lies and tarnishes his father's honor, Munna enrols in a medical college. Hijinks ensue when Munna, upon finding that Asthana is the college's dean, vows revenge, while also sparking a romance with a house doctor, Suman (Singh), unaware that she is Asthana's daughter.

Munna Bhai M.B.B.S. was a major critical and commercial success, and was later followed by a second film Lage Raho Munna Bhai, thus becoming the first installment of the Munna Bhai film series. The film went on to win the 2004 National Film Award for Best Popular Film, and several Filmfare awards, including the Best Film (Critics) and Best Screenplay. At the box office, it achieved a silver jubilee status (25-week run) being one of only eight Hindi films to have achieved this status since the year 2000. In its 26th week of release, the film could still be found playing on 300 screens throughout India.

Hirani revealed in an interview in September 2019 that production on the third Munna Bhai film starring Dutt in the title role will begin in towards the end of 2020.

Plot 
Murli Prasad Sharma, nicknamed "Munna Bhai", runs an extortion racket on the streets of Mumbai. He is supported by his loyal henchman, Circuit, who does most of his work for him. Once a year, Munna's gang converts his hide-out into a fully-functioning hospital, to fool Munna's visiting parents Hariprasad and Parvati, who believe Munna has become a real doctor. Munna's goons take turns playing doctors, staff and patients, to keep up the charade.

This works for many years, until one of Hari's annual visits with Parvati culminates in Hari bumping into Dr. Jagdish Asthana, who founded the first hospital in Munna's village years ago. Hari proposes to Asthana that they get Asthana's daughter "Chinki" and Munna married. Asthana agrees, even though Munna calls "Chinki" and asks her to reject him, lest his parents discover the truth. However, it is when his maid reacts shockingly to Munna's photo that Asthana realizes the truth, and exposes Munna to Hari and Parvati. Humiliated and embarrassed at their son's lack of a real vocation, his parents leave the city and return home. Munna vows to set things right and exact vengeance from Asthana by getting a medical degree, but unknowingly ends up enrolling in the same college whose dean is Asthana. Certain that Munna has cheated his way through the entrance exam, but pending real evidence, Asthana is forced to allow Munna to study there.

Upon becoming a student, Munna falls back to his ways by flouting all the rules of the hospital. He enforces his regime of "common-sense treatment", directly challenging Asthana's conventional opinions to get under his skin. He also calls upon Circuit to 'tweak' the system for him when needed. His behaviour is well-received by the hospital staff and patients, who are able to see the good-natured intent behind his anti-establishment actions. 

Meanwhile, Munna also develops a friendly relationship with Dr. Suman, who works at the hospital, unaware that she is "Chinki", an ignorance she hilariously exploits. Munna uses old-fashioned kindness and love to 'cure' many patients at the hospital, including Karan, a suicidal youngster he met on his first day of college, and home surgeon Dr. Rustom Pawri's father, who at one point fell ill and short of a desire to live. He even arranges to bring a stripper inside the patient ward to cheer up Zaheer, a man dying from cancer who he befriends in the process. 

When Asthana learns about the stripper episode, he sees this as a potential reason to expel Munna on disciplinary grounds, but is unable to do so after Munna injures himself in order to stay back. However, when he does recover, the hospital staff, patients and students stand in Asthana's way and refuse to let Munna leave. Munna is then made to take a test in front of the entire college the next day to keep his enrolment. Later that night, Zaheer dies; still in shock, Munna gives up at a point during the test and leaves; in the process, Anand Banerjee, a paraplegic patient who has been brain-dead for the last 12 years, comes back to life. Asthana, finally moved, is forced to change his opinion of Munna.

Munna does not end up becoming a doctor, but news of his 'miraculous' treatments reaches his parents. They return to the city and forgive him. Munna ends up marrying Suman after learning of her true identity, and together, they open a real hospital in Munna's family village.

Cast 
The cast is listed below (according to credits):-
 Sunil Dutt as Shri Hariprasad Sharma, Munna's father
 Sanjay Dutt as Murliprasad "Munna Bhai" Sharma, a gangster and medical student in Mumbai
 Gracy Singh as Dr. Suman "Chinki" Asthana, Dr. Asthana's daughter and a doctor who works alongside her father in the same hospital
 Jimmy Shergill as Zaheer Ali, Suman's hospital patient & Munna's friend
 Arshad Warsi as Sarkeshwar "Circuit" Mishra, Munna's sidekick
 Rohini Hattangadi as Parvati Sharma, Munna's mother
 Boman Irani as Dr. Jagdish "J." (J dot) Asthana, Chinki's father and the college dean
 Kurush Deboo as Dr. Rustam Pawri
 Yatin Karyekar as Anand Banerjee, hospital patient
 Nawazuddin Siddiqui as a pickpocket who tried to steal Hari's wallet (special appearance)
 Rohitash Gaud as the Tender Coconut Seller at Park
 Neha Dubey as fake Chinki, Suman's friend
 Mumaith Khan as Nandini 'Reena', the dancer in the song 'Dekh Le' (special appearance)
 Priya Bapat as Meenal, 1st Year Medical Student
 Pushkar Shrotri as a Professor in the college
 Sundeep Suthar as Chaiwallah
 Vishal Thakkar as Karan, the suicide patient
 Anuradha Chandan as Vidya, Karan's mother
 Khurshed Lawyer as Nagrajan Swamy, Munna's roommate and friend

Production 
In an interview, Hirani discussed how the idea for the film emerged from his interaction with some friends who were medical students. Later, he also had the opportunity to interact with a lot of medical professionals when some members of his family became sick. These experiences gave birth to the idea for the film.

During the scripting stage, Hirani wanted Anil Kapoor to play the lead role. However, Shah Rukh Khan was later cast as Munna along with Sanjay Dutt as Zaheer but due to his back problems Khan was forced to turn down the film. Nevertheless, the end credits of the film thank Khan for his inputs into the script. Hirani also narrated the script to Aishwarya Rai during the time he was in talks with Shahrukh Khan. Khan and Rai were working together on Devdas at the time. Vivek Oberoi was considered for the role, but in the end Sanjay Dutt took the role as Munna, which ultimately gave him an image make over and helped change the public perception of the controversial superstar; his real-life father Sunil Dutt returned to the silver screen after 10 years to play Munna's father. This is the first and only film in which real-life father and son Sunil and Sanjay appear together, although they both appeared in Reshma Aur Shera (1971), Rocky (1981) and Kshatriya (1993) but not in any scenes together.

The original choice for Circuit's role was Makarand Deshpande. Arshad Warsi took over the role which proved to be a turning point for his career. The scenes of the Medical College were shot at the Agriculture College of Pune and Grant Medical College Mumbai.

The film has a similar premise to the 1998 American film Patch Adams, starring Robin Williams. The producer Vidhu Vinod Chopra, however, denies there being a resemblance, and says that he had not watched the film before the release of Munna Bhai.

Hirani did not have a big budget to shoot the film. As a result, he had to change the way certain scenes were shot. For example, the film ends with stills of Munna Bhai's wedding. Hirani was told that setting up a wedding stage and making a wedding outfit for Gracie Singh would cost him several thousand rupees. To save on some of that money, Hirani arranged to have the stills shot on an actual wedding stage set up for a real wedding near the sets. The production team reached an agreement with the wedding hall management and used their stage after a wedding ended.

Music 

The music is composed by Anu Malik. Lyrics for the songs are penned by Abbas Tyrewala and Rahat Indori. According to the Indian trade website Box Office India, with around  units sold, this film's soundtrack album was the year's one of the highest-selling.

Accolades 
Munna Bhai M.B.B.S. was the recipient of a number of awards. At the 50th Filmfare Awards, it received the Best Film (Critics), Best Screenplay, the Best Dialogue, and Best Comedian (for Warsi) in addition to four other nominations. It won a number of awards at the 2004 Zee Cine Awards including Best Debuting Director, Best Actor in a Comic Role (for Warsi), Best Cinematography, and Best Dialogue.

Other ceremonies include the 2004 National Film Awards where it won the National Film Award for Best Popular Film and the 2004 International Indian Film Academy Awards where it won the IIFA Best Comedian Award.

Sequel 

In February 2004, after the success of Munna Bhai M.B.B.S., Rajkumar Hirani decided to work on his next project. He, along with his co-writer Abhijat Joshi, started to write the script of their new film. They didn't wanted that script to include Munnabhai but after they wrote it, the script eventually turned out to be of Lage Raho Munna Bhai. Sanjay Dutt, Sunil Dutt, Arshad Warsi and Boman Irani were to reprise their roles but after the death of Sunil in May 2005, Hirani decided that the film will only have Sanjay & Warsi to reprise their characters from Munna Bhai M.B.B.S. and other actors like Boman Irani and Jimmy Shergill were cast in new roles. Lage Raho Munna Bhai was released on 1 September 2006 and turned out to be a huge success.
Munna Bhai part 3 is still in making.

Remakes 
The film was remade in Tamil as Vasool Raja MBBS (2004), in Telugu as Shankar Dada M.B.B.S. (2004), in Kannada as  Uppi Dada M.B.B.S. (2007) and in Sinhala as Dr. Nawariyan (2017).

References

External links 
Official Website
 
 
 
Munna Bhai M.B.B.S. at Rediff.com

2003 films
Films set in Mumbai
2000s crime comedy-drama films
Indian crime comedy-drama films
Hindi films remade in other languages
2000s Hindi-language films
Medical-themed films
Films scored by Anu Malik
Indian gangster films
Best Popular Film Providing Wholesome Entertainment National Film Award winners
Films directed by Rajkumar Hirani
2003 directorial debut films
2003 comedy films
2003 drama films